John Asher Walker (June 5, 1912 – June 21, 2012) was an American politician in the state of Iowa.

Walker was born in Hamilton County, Iowa. He attended Ellsworth Junior College, the American Institute of Business, and Grinnell College, and was a farmer, banker and former employee at J.C. Penney. Walker served in the House of Representatives as a Republican from 1947 to 1955 (district 63), and in the State Senate from 1955 to 1967 (districts 37 and 35). He married Violet Michaels and with her had three children. They would later divorce, and he married Margaret Moeller in 1971. He died in 2012 at the age of 100 and is buried in Jewell, Iowa.

References

2012 deaths
1912 births
People from Hamilton County, Iowa
Grinnell College alumni
Farmers from Iowa
Republican Party Iowa state senators
Republican Party members of the Iowa House of Representatives
American centenarians
Men centenarians